Kamby arro is a popular dessert in Paraguay. It is a variation of arroz con leche, a rice pudding produced from cooked rice and cow's milk.

Origin of the name 
The Spanish words directly relate to the two ingredients that make the dish, milk and rice.

In Guaraní, “kamby arro” in the same way, directly translates to the ingredients in the dish "kamby" (milk) and "arro" (rice).

Ingredients
There are many different ways to prepare kamby arró, thus the ingredients may vary according to each version.

The most traditional recipes use cow’s milk, water, rice, sugar, lemon peel and cinnamon.

Preparation
The rice is first washed and poured into a pot with milk, sugar, water and lemon peel. The mixture is then boiled slowly until it acquires a thick texture while being mixed occasionally to avoid any rice sticking to the cooking appliance.

When the mixture becomes creamy, it is served in little containers. Cinnamon powder is dusted on the cream. The kamby arró is then served cold.

There is one variant in the preparation of the kamby arró in which vanilla is added to the ingredients mentioned above, thus creating a different flavor.

Cultural views
In the Paraguayan country-side, the kamby arró is considered nutritious and a way to boost intelligence because of the use of cinnamon.

References

“Tembi’u Paraguay” de Josefina Velilla de Aquino
“Karú rekó – Antropología culinaria paraguaya”, de Margarita Miró Ibars

External links
 Guarani Raity

Paraguayan cuisine
Rice pudding